Iron Mountain is an 11,149-foot-elevation (3,398 meter) summit located in the Sierra Nevada mountain range in Madera County of northern California, United States. It is situated in the Ansel Adams Wilderness, on the boundary shared by Inyo National Forest with Sierra National Forest. Devils Postpile National Monument is 4.5 miles to the east and the Minarets are three miles to the north. Precipitation runoff from the west side of this mountain drains to North Fork San Joaquin River, and from the east slope to the Middle Fork San Joaquin. There are climbing routes to the summit via the south slope and east face, and inclusion on the Sierra Peaks Section peakbagging list generates climbing interest.

Etymology
The mountain's name is attributable to iron ore found on the west shoulder of the peak. The toponym was likely applied by the Wheeler Survey, and has been officially adopted by the U.S. Board on Geographic Names.

Climate
According to the Köppen climate classification system, Iron Mountain is located in an alpine climate zone. Most weather fronts originate in the Pacific Ocean, and travel east toward the Sierra Nevada mountains. As fronts approach, they are forced upward by the peaks (orographic lift), causing them to drop their moisture in the form of rain or snowfall onto the range.

See also
 
 Sierra Nevada
 Volcanic Ridge

Gallery

References

External links
 NGS Data Sheet: Iron Mountain
 Aerial video of Iron Mountain and Iron Lake: Gettyimages.com

Sierra National Forest
Mountains of Madera County, California
Mountains of the Ansel Adams Wilderness
North American 3000 m summits
Mountains of Northern California
Sierra Nevada (United States)
Inyo National Forest